The I Liga (English: First League) is the second-tier level league of basketball in Poland. It is organised by the Polish Basketball Association. Teams that win the championship have the option to be promoted to the first-tier level Polish Basketball League (PLK). The first I Liga season was held in the 1954–55 season.

Recent champions

References

Basketball leagues in Poland
Basketball in Poland
Poland
Sports leagues established in 1995
1995 establishments in Poland
Professional sports leagues in Poland